Ahrid Hannaley (born May 3, 1987), is a Mexican television host and actress.

Filmography

Film

Television

References

External links 

Living people
1987 births
Mexican telenovela actresses
Mexican film actresses
Mexican television actresses
Actresses from Mexico City
20th-century Mexican actresses
21st-century Mexican actresses
Mexican people of Scottish descent